"Wicked Wonderland" is a 2014 single by Norwegian DJ and record producer Martin Tungevaag and his first major hit.
It was co-produced in collaboration with Norwegian DJ and producer Olly Hence.The track was produced at Starlab Studios in Oslo,Norway.

The single charted in Norway, Germany, Switzerland and topped the Austrian Singles Chart.

The single in Japan became famous, due to TikTok.

Music video
The official music video is a mix of an ordinary video and a "lyrics video". The scenes display two young women flirting on a seaside or in a pool in a touristic resort or hitting the road together in a scenic panorama. The shots are interspersed with a musician performing on the saxophone.

Track list
"Wicked Wonderland" (3:37)
"Wicked Wonderland" (extended mix) (5:09)
"Wicked Wonderland" (Olly Hence radio edit) (3:37)
"Wicked Wonderland" (Olly Hence remix) (5:30)
"Wicked Wonderland" (instrumental) (3:37)
"Wicked Wonderland" (instrumental extended mix) (5:09)

Charts

Weekly charts

Year-end charts

Certifications

References 

2014 songs
Kontor Records singles
Martin Tungevaag songs
Number-one singles in Austria